Edmond Gareginovich Keosayan (9 October 1936 – 21 April 1994) was an Armenian Soviet film director and musician.

 1952-54 —  worked in Yerevan watch factory. 1954-56 — studied in Plekhanov Moscow Institute of Economy. 
 1956-58 — studied in Yerevan State Institute of Theatre and Cinematography, worked as a compere. 
 1964 — graduated from the Directing Department of VGIK (Efim Dzigan's master class). 
 Since 1964 — director at Mosfilm Studio. Occasionally worked at Armenfilm Studio.

He was also a compere of the Soviet State Variety Orchestra. His films are mainly in the Armenian and Russian languages.

He died on 21 April 1994 and was buried in the Kuntsevo Cemetery.

Filmography
1964: Why Are You Quiet Maxim?
1965: The Cook
1966: The Elusive Avengers
1968: The New Adventures of the Elusive Avengers
1971: The Crown of the Russian Empire or Once again the Elusive Avengers
1973: Tghamardik  
1975: The Canyon of Deserted Tales 
1975: When September Comes 
1978: Huso Astgh 
1980: Legend of the Clown  
1982: The Oriole Is Crying Somewhere 
1988: The Ascent  The Men'' is commemorated by a statue in Yerevan.

Edmond Keosayan Award
Edmond Keosayan Award for Excellence in Cardiology has been awarded since 2001 to outstanding young investigators who made high quality scientific research in either clinical or fundamental cardiology, during Young Medics International Conference, organized biannually in Yerevan by Armenian Medical Association. The winner for each category receives $2,000 from the Edmond Keosayan Foundation. The award was first awarded in 2008 during 4th YMIC, the money being shared between two candidates. The award was established by Tigran Keosayan as an expression of respect for lifelong friendship between Edmond Keosayan and Parounak Zelveian, his cardiologist and now the president of Armenian Medical Association.

References

External links
 
 
 

1936 births
1994 deaths
People from Gyumri
Ostern films
Soviet film directors
Armenian film directors
Armenian screenwriters
Soviet Armenians
Burials at Kuntsevo Cemetery
20th-century screenwriters